Iris Apfel ( Barrel; born August 29, 1921) is an American businesswoman, interior designer, and fashion icon. In business with her husband, Carl, from 1950 to 1992, Apfel led a career in textiles, including a contract with the White House that spanned nine presidencies. In retirement, she drew acclaim for a 2005 show at the Costume Institute at The Metropolitan Museum of Art featuring her collection of costume jewelry and styled with clothes on mannequins as she would wear it. She has become a fashion icon, she signed to IMG in 2019 as a model at age 97, and she was featured in a 2014 documentary called Iris by Albert Maysles.

Early life
Born Iris Barrel in Astoria, Queens, New York on August 29, 1921, Apfel is the only child of Samuel Barrel (1897–1967), whose family owned a glass and mirror business, and his Russian-born wife, Sadye Barrel (née Asofsky) (1898–1998), who owned a fashion boutique. Both were Jewish. Although raised on a farm by her parents and grandparents, she often rode the subway in to explore Manhattan, where she fell in love with Greenwich Village. While still a child, she shopped its antique shops, starting her extraordinary collection of jewellery from around the world.

She studied art history at New York University and attended art school at the University of Wisconsin.

Career
As a young woman, Apfel worked as a copywriter for Women's Wear Daily, earning $15 a week, and for interior designer Elinor Johnson, dressing apartments for resale and honing her talent for sourcing rare items. She was also an assistant to illustrator Robert Goodman.

On February 22, 1948, she married Carl Apfel (August 4, 1914 – August 1, 2015). Two years later, in 1950, they launched the textile firm Old World Weavers and ran it until they retired in 1992. The Apfels specialised in fabric reproductions from the 17th, 18th and 19th centuries, and traveled to Europe twice a year in search of textiles they could not source in the United States.  The business's New York showroom was located at 115 East 57th Street in Manhattan. Over her career, Iris Apfel took part in a variety of design restoration projects, including work at the White House for nine presidents: Harry S. Truman, Dwight D. Eisenhower, John F. Kennedy, Lyndon B. Johnson, Richard Nixon, Gerald Ford, Jimmy Carter, Ronald Reagan, and Bill Clinton. She found the White House contract to be among the easiest of Old World Weaver's clients, as they generally wanted only to replicate what had previously been in place. The one exception, Apfel said, was Jacqueline Kennedy. Apfel recalled: “She employed a very famous Parisian designer to gussy up the house and make it a real Frenchie, and the design community went bananas. After that we had to throw it all out and start again. But I did like Mrs Nixon. She was lovely.”

Through their business, the couple began travelling all over the world where Apfel also bought pieces of non-Western, artisanal clothes. She wore these clothes to clients' high-society parties.

In 2011, Iris Apfel became a visiting professor at the University of Texas at Austin in its Division of Textiles and Apparel.

In 2016, she performed in a television commercial for the French car DS 3, and was the face of Australian brand Blue Illusion.  In March 2016, Apfel announced a collaboration with technology startup WiseWear on an upcoming line of Smart Jewellery. In 2018 she published a biography with HarperCollins entitled Iris Apfel: Accidental Icon.

In 2019, at the age of 97, she signed a modelling contract with global agency IMG. Seeing she was frequently sought out for appearances, Tommy Hilfiger encouraged her to sign with formal representation.

Legacy

Museum retrospectives
On September 13, 2005, The Costume Institute at the Metropolitan Museum of Art in New York City premiered an exhibition about Iris Apfel's style entitled Rara Avis (Rare Bird): The Irreverent Iris Apfel. It was the museum's first time showcasing an exhibit about clothing and accessories focused on a living person who wasn't a designer. The success of the exhibition, curated by Stéphane Houy-Towner, prompted an initial traveling version of the exhibit at the Norton Museum of Art in West Palm Beach, Florida, the Nassau County Museum of Art in Roslyn Harbor, New York, and later at the Peabody Essex Museum in Salem, Massachusetts.

The Museum of Lifestyle & Fashion History in Boynton Beach, Florida, is designing a building that will house a dedicated gallery of Apfel's clothes, accessories, and furnishings.

Advisory and academic roles
At age 90 in 2012, Apfel was a visiting professor at University of Texas at Austin.

Apfel consults and lectures about style and other fashion topics. In 2013, she was listed as one of the fifty "Best-Dressed over 50" by The Guardian.

Documentaries
Apfel is the star of a documentary by Albert Maysles, called Iris. It premiered at the New York Film Festival in October 2014, and was subsequently acquired by Magnolia Pictures for US theatrical distribution in 2015.

Apfel was also featured in the documentary If You're Not in the Obit, Eat Breakfast, a television film which premiered in 2017.

Barbie doll 
In 2018, Mattel created a Barbie doll in Apfel's image, making her the oldest person to ever have a Barbie made in her image and the recipient of the highest honor the Barbie brand bestows. The Barbie, released in conjunction with Apfel's book, was not for sale, but Mattel also made two “Styled by Iris Apfel" Barbie dolls that were commercially available.

Awards
Iris Apfel was awarded the Women Together Special Award of the Year at the 12th Annual Women Together Gala at the United Nations Headquarters in New York City, June 7, 2016. She was accompanied by other awardees, including Hollywood actress Rosario Dawson, the Punta Cana Foundation, the Loewe Foundation and others. Apfel was handed the award by Malu Edwards Hurley, member of the board of directors of Women Together and MC of the gala event, together with Carlos Jimenez, representative of Spain at the United Nations Headquarters in Brussels.

In November 2016, Apfel was awarded the Women's Entrepreneurship Day Pioneer Award for her work in the fashion field at the United Nations in New York City.

Apfel was honored as The New Jewish Home's Eight over Eighty Gala 2017 honoree.

Personal life
The Apfels did not have children, partly because of the amount of travel their work necessitated; she did not want children to be raised by a nanny.

Apfel and her husband Carl shared a favorite fragrance: Yatagan by Caron.

Married 67 years, Carl died on August 1, 2015, aged 100. Apfel celebrated her 100th birthday on August 29, 2021.

References

1921 births
Living people
20th-century American businesspeople
20th-century American businesswomen
20th-century American Jews
21st-century American businesspeople
21st-century American businesswomen
21st-century American Jews
American centenarians
American interior designers
American people of Russian-Jewish descent
American women interior designers
Businesspeople from New York City
Jewish American philanthropists
New York University Institute of Fine Arts alumni
University of Wisconsin–Madison alumni
Women centenarians